The Sprawler (Asteroscopus sphinx) is a moth of the family Noctuoidea. It is found throughout western Europe, but is mainly a Northern species occurring South to Northern Spain the southern edge of the Alps, Central Italy and Northern Greece. North to southern Sweden. East to Kaliningrad and Moscow. Also in Central Europe, Turkey, the Caucasus and Asia Minor.

Description

The wingspan is 39–49 mm. The length of the forewings is 17–22 mm."Forewing pale luteous grey, more or less strongly dusted with olive grey: a thick black streak from base below cell, with a finer streak above and beyond it, and another beyond it below submedian fold; outer line marked by black vein dashes on a paler space; orbicular stigma flattened, elongate, edged with black; reniform large irregularly 8-shaped, the lower half angled and reaching below median vein: submarginal line pale, preceded by black wedgeshaped marks between veins and followed by black streaks from termen in the intervals, the indentation on submedian fold more strongly marked; veins towards margin finely black; fringe chequered pale and dark grey; hindwing whitish, grey-speckled, the veins darker: a dull grey cellspot, and marginal row of black lunules; the female is darker throughout, more brownish tinged."

Biology
The moth flies in one generation in from early September to November .

The larva is bright velvety green; dorsal and subdorsal lines chalk white, the latter commencing only at segment 4; spiracular line yellowish white, with dark upper edge; face green with two yellow streaks. The larvae feed on various deciduous trees and shrubs, such as Corylus avellana, Quercus, Fraxinus excelsior and Salix.

Habitats include deciduous and mixed forests, but also such as hedges, gardens, to parks and avenues.

Notes
The flight season refers to Belgium and The Netherlands. This may vary in other parts of the range.

References

External links

The Sprawler on UK Moths
Butterflies and Moths of Northern Ireland
Fauna Europaea
Funet
Lepidoptera of Belgium
Lepiforum.de
Vlindernet.nl 
waarneming.nl 

Psaphidinae
Moths of Europe
Moths of Asia
Taxa named by Johann Siegfried Hufnagel
Moths described in 1766